The Raccoon River Conference is a nine team high school athletic league in central Iowa. Made up of mid-sized school districts located mostly west of Des Moines, all schools in the conference are currently 3A schools, the second largest class of schools in Iowa.

Current members

Former members
• * Indicates that school is no longer operating

History

The Raccoon River Conference was once a small school conference. The conference was made up of Bondurant–Farrar, Norwalk, Madrid, Woodward-Granger, Interstate 35 in Truro, Waukee, Dallas Center-Grimes, and Adel–De Soto at it outset. While the outer regions of the Des Moines metro began to experience growth, Bondurant–Farrar and Ogden decided to leave for the smaller Heart of Iowa Conference, while I-35 joined the Pride of Iowa Conference. Woodward-Granger soon followed their former members to the HOI conference. This flurry of change saw the league reform itself. By 1998, there were 14 members in the conference, competing in two divisions. The league now consisted of A-D-M, Ballard, Carlisle, Carroll, Dallas Center-Grimes, Jefferson–Scranton, Nevada, North Polk, Perry, Prairie City-Monroe, Saydel, Waukee, West Central Valley, and Winterset. Over the next two years, North Polk, Prairie City-Monroe, Waukee, and W.C. Valley all joined different conferences, leaving the league with ten teams. In 2007, Jefferson–Scranton left for the Heart of Iowa Conference. Nevada followed them there in 2009, the same year Boone joined the league.

Bondurant–Farrar joined the Raccoon River Conference in the 2011–12 school year. Dallas Center-Grimes, one of the league's founding members, left for the Little Hawkeye Conference in 2013.

Gilbert and North Polk both joined for the 2020–21 school year. They left their former conference, the Heart of Iowa Conference.

External links
 Official site

References

High school sports in Iowa